Dalek Dash (also Romanized as Dalek Dāsh; also known as Dalīk Dāsh and Dalik Dasht) is a village in Mokriyan-e Shomali Rural District, in the Central District of Miandoab County, West Azerbaijan Province, Iran. At the 2006 census, its population was 335, in 74 families.

References 

Populated places in Miandoab County